Arthur F. DeFoe better known as Ott Defoe  (born September 17, 1985), is a professional bass fisherman from Knoxville, Tennessee.

He was the 2019 Bassmaster Classic Champion with a total weigh in of 49lbs -3oz and took the cash winnings of $300,000 (US). As of March 2019 he has had 6 wins in Bassmaster Professional Tournaments and has collected over $2,000,000 in prize money.

He was the Bassmaster 2011 Rookie of the Year.

He is sponsored by Bass Pro Shops, Nitro Boats, Mercury, Humminbird, Mossy Oak, Minn Kota/Talon, General Tire, Costa, Huk, Buff, T-H Marine, Lithium Pros, Rapala Terminator, VMC, Onyx/Arctic Shield, Aqua-Vu, Swagger Tackle, Superior Walls of East Tennessee/Warrior Precast, Dowco, and Joe's Jerky.

Personal life 

He is married to his wife Jennie and they have three children Abbie, Parker, and Elizabeth.

His is the son of Bud and Erieka DeFoe.

Career Stats 
 1 Bassmaster Classic Titles 
 Career winnings: over $2,000,000 (B.A.S.S.)
 Career Wins: 6
 Career Top Ten finishes: 28
 Times in the BASSMASTER Classic: 8

References 

American fishers
1985 births
Living people
People from Grainger County, Tennessee